Rucervus is a genus of deer from India, Nepal, Indochina, and the Chinese island of Hainan. The only extant representatives, the barasingha or swamp deer (R. duvaucelii) and Eld's deer (R. eldii), are threatened by habitat loss and hunting; another species, Schomburgk’s deer (R. schomburgki), went extinct in 1938. Deer species found within the genus Rucervus are characterized by a specific antler structure, where the basal ramification is often supplemented with an additional small prong, and the middle tine is never present. The crown tines are inserted on the posterior side of the beam and may be bifurcated or fused into a small palmation.

Species

Extant species

Extinct species
Rucervus ardei (Croizet & Jobert, 1828) (Pliocene, France)
Rucervus colberti (Azzaroli, 1954) (Tertiary, Sivalik Hills)
Rucervus gigans Croitor, 2018 (Early Pleistocene, Greece)
Rucervus giulii (Kahlke, 1997) (Early Pleistocene, Germany)
Rucervus radulescui Croitor, 2018 (Early Pleistocene, Romania)
Rucervus schomburgki - Schomburgk's deer (Thailand; extinct, 1938)
Rucervus simplicidens (Lydekker, 1876) (Tertiary, Sivalik Hills)
Rucervus verestchagini (David, 1992) (Early Pleistocene, Moldova)

According to the old tradition of zoological taxonomy, swamp deer originally were regarded as members of the genus Cervus. Rucervus was originally proposed by Hodgson   as a subgenus of the genus Cervus. The original definition of  Rucervus was mostly based on antler shape believed to be intermediate between that of 'elaphus' and 'hippelaphus'. Hodgson  reported that upper canines are present only in males of barasingha, but the additional craniological material shows that upper canines are present in both sexes. Eld's deer was regarded as another species of the genus Rucervus, however, the recent genetic evidences suggest that Eld's deer is most closely related to Père David's deer and should be placed in its own genus, Panolia. However, it has recently been place back into Rucervus by the American Society of Mammalogists despite Eld's deer is not closely related to barasingha in genetics and antler structure.

Rucervus is an ancient cervid lineage that--together with the genus Axis--represents the oldest evolutionary radiation of the subfamily Cervinae (plesiometacarpal deer).

Paleontological record
The fossil species of Rucervus of Europe were included in the genus Arvernoceros Heintz, 1971 (the type species: Cervus ardei Croizet & Jobert, 1828) or in the genus Eucladoceros, as in the case of R. giulii. Today, Arvernoceros is regarded as a subgenus of Rucervus. The European fossil forms of Rucervus are distinguished from the South Asian species by more compact crown part of the antler and by the frequent development of a small distal palmation as for instance in R. ardei and R. radulescui. South Asian fossil forms of Rucervus are represented by large-sized R. simplicidens and R. colberti. The late Early Pleistocene of Greece has yielded the remains of a giant species R. gigans that rivaled in size Irish elk Megaloceros giganteus, The giant Rucervus from Greece is distinguished by unusually for such a large animal long limbs and apparently is closely related to R. simplicidens and R. colberti from the Sivaliks. The Southwest-Europe  endemic Mid to early Late Pleistocene genus Haploidoceros is regarded as closely allied.

References

Cervines
Mammal genera
Taxa named by Brian Houghton Hodgson